The year 2010 is the 3rd year in the history of World Victory Road, a mixed martial arts promotion based in Japan. In 2010 World Victory Road held 6 events beginning with, World Victory Road Presents: Sengoku Raiden Championships 12.

Title fights

Events list

World Victory Road Presents: Sengoku Raiden Championships 12

World Victory Road Presents: Sengoku Raiden Championships 12 was an event held on March 7, 2010 at the Ryogoku Kokugikan in Tokyo, Japan.

Results

World Victory Road Presents: Sengoku Raiden Championships 13

World Victory Road Presents: Sengoku Raiden Championships 13 was an event held on June 20, 2010 at the Ryogoku Kokugikan in Tokyo, Japan.

Results

World Victory Road Presents: Asia Vol. 1

World Victory Road Presents: Asia Vol. 1 was an event held on July 4, 2010 at Differ Ariake in Tokyo, Japan.

Results

World Victory Road Presents: Sengoku Raiden Championships 14

World Victory Road Presents: Sengoku Raiden Championships 14 was an event held on August 22, 2010 at the Ryogoku Kokugikan in Tokyo, Japan.

Results

World Victory Road Presents: Sengoku Raiden Championships 15

World Victory Road Presents: Sengoku Raiden Championships 15 was an event held on October 30, 2010 at the Ryogoku Kokugikan in Tokyo, Japan.

Results

World Victory Road Presents: Soul of Fight

World Victory Road Presents: Soul of Fight was an event held on December 30, 2010 at the Ariake Coliseum in Tokyo, Japan.

Results

See also 
 World Victory Road

References

World Victory Road events
2010 in mixed martial arts